Vincent Fynch may refer to:

Vincent Fynch I, MP for Winchelsea (UK Parliament constituency) 1395-1402
Vincent Fynch II (d.c.1430), MP for Winchelsea (UK Parliament constituency) 1406 and 1426